Marshall Eugene DeWolfe (September 22, 1880 – January 1, 1915) was the only child of future First Lady Florence Harding (then, Florence Kling) and her first husband, Henry Athenton "Pete" DeWolfe (March 4, 1859 – March 8, 1894). Born in Galion, Crawford County, Ohio, young DeWolfe was primarily raised by his mother; his father was a chronic alcoholic who was absent from the home for days at a time.

Those doing research on the Hardings, including John Dean and Robert Ferrell among others, have never been able to find documentary proof of a regular marriage between Kling and DeWolfe, leading some people to conclude it was a common law marriage—a form of irregular marriage contracted by habit and repute, which was not abolished in Ohio until 1891.  The marriage between Kling and DeWolfe is otherwise attested by the papers from their divorce proceeding, which are on file in Marion County, Ohio. It is also possible that they had a regular marriage and the officiant who solemnized it simply failed to return the marriage certificate to the county, or the county clerk's office subsequently lost it.

A record of the issuance of a marriage license was printed in The Marion Star on January 31, 1880; and the January 27, 1880, edition of the same paper refers to a marriage having occurred at Columbus on January 22, 1880.  The documentary proof of a regular marriage is the marriage certificate, which is completed by the solemnizing officiant and returned to the county clerk for recordation. The marriage certificate usually comprises the lower part of the same document as the marriage license, so if the certificate gets lost on its way to the county clerk the license will be lost along with it.

Following the divorce of his parents, Marshall was raised by his grandparents, Amos Hall Kling and Louisa "Louise" Mabel (Bouton) Kling, while his mother lived independently and earned an income as a piano teacher in Marion, Ohio. As part of the agreement with her father, Florence would not have a role in her own son’s upbringing. Throughout his life, Marshall used either his Kling or DeWolfe surname.

Florence Kling DeWolfe married newspaper publisher Warren G. Harding in 1891. However, Marshall remained under his grandfather's control and roof.  While a room was set aside for him in the Harding home, Marshall never felt at home under his mother's roof, and never comfortable under his grandfather's strict control.

DeWolfe studied journalism at the University of Michigan from 1899 to 1903.  While attending Michigan, he played football as a quarterback on the Michigan Wolverines all-freshman football team in 1899.

DeWolfe aspired to be a newspaperman like his stepfather Warren G. Harding. By all accounts, his relationship with Harding was closer than the relationship that he had with his mother. After his graduation from Marion High School, DeWolfe was given a job at the Marion Daily Star. DeWolfe eventually purchased a struggling newspaper in Colorado, moving there with his young family. The venture was unsuccessful, as was a later farming attempt, due in part to his alcoholism.

DeWolfe died of the effects of alcoholism and tuberculosis in Colorado on January 1, 1915, at the age of 34. His death, the return of his body to Marion and his funeral were events that were not known in the community. He is buried in an unmarked grave in the DeWolfe family plot in Marion Cemetery.

DeWolfe married Esther Naomi Neely. Their son, George Warren DeWolfe (1914–1968), and daughter, Eugenia DeWolfe (1911–1978), were the principal heirs to the estate left by their grandmother, Florence Harding, following her death on November 21, 1924.

When Warren G. Harding ran for President in 1920, his wife skillfully bluffed reporters into believing that she had been a widow, not a divorcee, when they married. When she became First Lady, her ex-husband and son were forbidden topics at the White House and in the press.

References

 
 

1880 births
1915 deaths
20th-century deaths from tuberculosis
Michigan Wolverines football players
People from Galion, Ohio
Harding family
University of Michigan College of Literature, Science, and the Arts alumni
Warren G. Harding
Tuberculosis deaths in Colorado
Alcohol-related deaths in Colorado